is a railway station in the city of Gamagōri, Aichi Prefecture, Japan, operated by Meitetsu.

Lines

Station layout
The station has one side platform serving a single bi-directional track. The station is unattended.

Adjacent stations

|-
!colspan=5|Nagoya Railroad

Station history
Mikawa Kashima Station was opened on July 24, 1936.

Surrounding area
Katahara onsen

See also
 List of Railway Stations in Japan

External links

 Official web page

Railway stations in Japan opened in 1936
Railway stations in Aichi Prefecture
Stations of Nagoya Railroad
Gamagōri, Aichi